La Tournée des grands espaces (The wide spaces tour) is the fourth live album by Alain Bashung, issued in 2004 on Barclay Records. It documents the 2003-2004 tour which followed the album L'Imprudence.

Production 
The scene of the Tournée des Grands Espaces tour was a metallic slope inclined towards the audience, Alain Bashung singing in the center, with the musicians surrounding him.

The tour was produced by Garance productions (Laurent Castanié), and directed by Vincent Boussard and Alain Poisson. The general direction was done by Jean-François Meinadier and the technical direction by François Lepaysan. Some European rock critics consider this to be one of the best live albums in the history of French music.

Reception 
In 2012 the French edition of Rolling Stone magazine named this album the 58th greatest live album ever (out of 100).

Track listing

Personnel

Musicians 
 Alain Bashung - vocal, guitar, harmonica.
 Geoffrey Burton - guitar.
 Adriano Cominotto - keyboards.
 Brad Scott - bass guitar, double bass.
 Arno Dieterlin - drums.
 Yann Péchin - mandoline, guitar.
 Nicolas Stevens - violin.
 Jean-François Assy - cello.
 Chloé Mons - vocals.

Production 
 Bob Coke: recording, mixing.
 Pierrick Devin: mixing.
 Ian Cooper: mastering.
 Anne Lamy: executive production.
 Lawrens Brunel, Juliette Roizard: production and promotion assistants.
 Mathieu Zazzo, Dominique Gonzalez-Forestier, Don Kent: booklet photos.

Reception 

2004 live albums
Barclay (record label) live albums
Alain Bashung albums